The following lists events that happened during 1907 in Chile.

Incumbents
President of Chile: Pedro Montt

Events 

18 January – Parliament of Coz Coz
21 December – Santa María School massacre

Births
20 December – Tomas Barraza, fencer (d. 1948)

Deaths 
4 November – Diego Barros Arana, historian (b. 1830)

References 

 
Years of the 20th century in Chile
Chile
Chile
1900s in Chile